Mord means "murder" in German and the Scandinavian languages, and can refer to:

 Murder (German law) 
 Murder (Norwegian law)
 Murder (Swedish law)
 Murder (Swiss law)

 Mord (cards) - a contract to win every trick in certain card games